HLA-B45 (B45) is an HLA-B serotype. The serotype identifies the B*45 gene-allele protein products of HLA-B.

B45 is a split antigen of the broad antigen B12, and is a sister type of B44.
Gene products of 45 not 44

Serotype

Alleles
It was reported that a novel haplotype was found in Italian bone marrow donors. A2-CW*1601-B45- DRB1*1101-DRB3*0301-DQA1*0102-DQB1*0502. This haplotype indicates possible very recent ancestry from Africa, with the Cw*1601 and B45 components and also with the DR11-DQ5.2 component both extremely rare in Europe.

References

4